Michael Condron  is a Canadian born actor from Northern Ireland.

Career 
Michael Condron plays Griff Reynolds in Coronation Street. He is award-winning actor, born in Toronto, Canada but was raised in Belfast, Northern Ireland. 

Condron has been active in several stage productions, mainly at the Lyric Theatre, Belfast. He portrayed Robert McGladdery in the BBC docu-film Last Man Hanging in 2008, and he played the role of Ricky in the BBC One series Number 2s in 2015. He appeared in minor roles in feature films such as Keith Lemon: The Film and High-Rise.

He most notably portrayed Bowen Marsh in season 5 and season 6 of the HBO series Game of Thrones. He was nominated for A Screen Actors Guild Award for Best performance in An Ensemble for Game of Thrones in 2016.

He plays Ben McGregor in the TV comedy series Soft Border Patrol.

Filmography

Film

Television

Theatre (selection) 
 Mojo-Mickybo, directed by Karl Wallace (Lyric Theatre Studio, Hammersmith, 2003)
 A Very Weird Manor, directed by Ian McElhinney (Lyric Theatre, Belfast, 2005)
 Mirandolina, directed by Jonathan Munby (Royal Exchange, Manchester, 2006)
 Much Ado About Nothing, directed by Rachel O'Riordan (Lyric Theatre, Belfast, 2007)
 To Be Sure, directed by Tim Loane (Lyric Theatre, Belfast, 2007)
 Macbeth, directed by Lynne Parker (Lyric Theatre, Belfast, 2012)
 The Boat Factory, regia di Philip Crawford (59E59 Theaters, New York City, 2013)
 Lally the Scut, directed by Michael Duke (The MAC, Belfast, 2015)
 Love or Money, directed by Stephen Kelly (Lyric Theatre, Belfast, 2016)
 The 39 Steps, directed by Lisa May (Lyric Theatre, Belfast, 2016)
 Smiley, directed by Conall Morrison (Lyric Theatre, Belfast, 2016)
 Sinners, directed by Mick Gordon (Lyric Theatre, Belfast, 2017)

References

External links

21st-century English male actors
Living people
Male television actors from Northern Ireland
Male film actors from Northern Ireland
Place of birth missing (living people)
Year of birth missing (living people)
Television actors from Northern Ireland